
Year 319 BC was a year of the pre-Julian Roman calendar. At the time, it was known as the Year of the Consulship of Cursor and Cerretanus (or, less frequently, year 435 Ab urbe condita). The denomination 319 BC for this year has been used since the early medieval period, when the Anno Domini calendar era became the prevalent method in Europe for naming years.

Events 
<onlyinclude>

By place

Macedonian Empire 
 The Athenian orator and diplomat, Demades, is sent to the Macedonian court, but either the Macedonian regent Antipater or his son Cassander, learning that Demades has intrigued with the former regent Perdiccas, puts him to death.
 Antipater becomes ill and dies shortly after, leaving the regency of the Macedonian Empire to the aged Polyperchon, passing over his son Cassander, a measure which gives rise to much confusion and ill-feeling.
 Polyperchon's authority is challenged by Antipater's son Cassander, who refuses to acknowledge the new regent. With the aid of Antigonus, ruler of Phrygia, and with the support of Ptolemy and Lysimachus, Cassander seizes  most of Greece including Macedonia.
 Eumenes allies himself with the regent Polyperchon. He manages to escape from the siege of Nora, and his forces soon threaten Syria and Phoenicia. Polyperchon recognises Eumenes as the royal general in Asia Minor.
 Alexander the Great's widow, Roxana, joins Alexander's mother, Olympias, in Epirus.

Births 
 Antigonus II Gonatas, Macedonian king (approximate date) (d. 239 BC)
 Pyrrhus of Epirus, King of the Molossians, Epirus and Macedonia (d. 272 BC)

Deaths 
 Antipater, Macedonian general, regent of Alexander the Great's empire (b. 397 BC)

References